The Taiwanese rock scene is nurtured by regular festivals, notably the annual Spring Scream, Hohaiyan and Formoz festivals.

Major Taiwanese rock acts include:

1976
Blacklist Studio
Chang Chen-yue
Cherry Boom
ChthoniC
Dong Cheng Wei
Elephant Gym
F.I.R.
Fire EX.
Guntzepaula
LTK Commune
Mayday
Power Station
Seraphim
Shin
Sodagreen
Sorry Youth
Sugar Plum Ferry
Wu Bai
Y2J (Shenmu yu Tong)

Rock music by country
Taiwanese music